This is a list of villages in the providence (Oblast) of Minsk in Belarus:
 Igraevo (Gulyaevo) - Slutsk District, Minsk
 Valoty -  Slutsk District, Minsk
 Iserna - Slutsk District, Minsk
 Dorosino - Slutsk District, Minsk
 Dubei - Slutsk District, Minsk
 Salihorsk - Slutsk District, Minsk
 Chepeli - Slutsk District, Minsk